The IIFA Award for Best Lyricist is chosen by the viewers and the winner is announced at the actual ceremony. The award is given in the current year but the winner is awarded for the previous year.

Superlatives

Javed Akhtar has the most wins with 6 awards. He also holds the record for most consecutive wins from 2001–02, 2004–05 and 2008–09 contributing to six awards.

List of Winners
The winners are listed below:

See also 
 IIFA Awards

References

External links 
Official site

International Indian Film Academy Awards